The Proto SLG is a paintball marker manufactured by DYE Precision under the Proto Paintball brand. "SLG" is short for "Super Light Gun."  It was first released in October 2007 as the 2008 model. With an MSRP of $200, the SLG is the most affordable marker DYE has ever produced, and it is intended to compete with other budget electropneumatic markers like the Smart Parts Ion.

Operation
Unlike other electropneumatic spool valve markers on the market, which use a solenoid valve to actuate the movement of the bolt, the SLG operates using a spool valve actuated by a mechanical solenoid and sear. This unique single-tube, sear-tripping, blow-forward operation is comparable to, though not identical to, the operation of the Automag. In the SLG, the recocking mechanism is air pressure acting on a smaller, forward-facing area to push the bolt back open when the pressure in the dump chamber—which acts on a larger, rearward-facing area—reaches a low pressure from firing and venting the dump chamber. In the Automag, this is accomplished by the return spring. If the sear is tripped but the dump chamber is not vented due to the bolt failing to close, the bleed button on the back cap can be depressed, which vents the dump to the outside through the back cap, thus allowing the bolt to recock.

There are 3 o-rings and two parts to the bolt kit: a bolt and backcap. Though more efficient than Proto's other markers, the SLG is also louder and has a bit more recoil. The SLG comes standard with Dye's Hyper3 regulator and wired eyes.  Though the trigger frame is polymer, it is stronger than the PMR gripframe. The stock board can go to around 30  and has NPPL, PSP 3-shot, Millinium, and NXL modes. The Dye Ultralite grip frame is not sold separately for this marker, though it comes stock in the new '09 Proto SLG.

This is Dye Precision's first non-matrix marker even though it says "Proto Matrix SLG" on the top of the box.

References

External links
Proto SLG product page at Proto Paintball
Photos from the Proto SLG's debut at the 2007 PSP World Cup at WARPIG

Paintball markers